V series or V-series may refer to:

 Cadillac V series, a line of high-performance vehicles 
 List of ITU-T V-series recommendations, on data communication over the telephone network
 LG V series, a line of high-end Android devices 
 V series of Sony Ericsson phones, exclusive to Vodafone
 V-series of nerve agents:
 VE (nerve agent)
 VG (nerve agent)
 VM (nerve agent)
 VR (nerve agent)
 VS (nerve agent)
 VX (nerve agent)
 V (TV series), the name of several TV series
 V Series (Sweden), a TV channel

See also
 U series (disambiguation)
 W series (disambiguation)